Merdeka Square may refer to:

Merdeka Square, Jakarta, Indonesia
Merdeka Square, Kuala Lumpur, Malaysia
Merdeka Square, Kota Kinabalu, Malaysia

See also
 Freedom Square (disambiguation)
 Independence Square (disambiguation)
 Merdeka Palace, Jakarta, Indonesia
 Istiqlal Mosque (disambiguation)